The 2008 Nordic Figure Skating Championships were held from February 7 through 10th, 2008 at the Egilshöll in Reykjavík, Iceland. The competition was open to elite figure skaters from Nordic countries. Skaters competed in two disciplines, men's singles and ladies' singles, across three levels: senior (Olympic-level), junior, and novice.

Senior results

Men

Ladies

Junior results

Men

Ladies

Novice results

Boys

Girls

External links
 Nordics 2008

Nordic Figure Skating Championships, 2008
Nordic Figure Skating Championships
International figure skating competitions hosted by Iceland
Nordic Figure Skating Championships, 2008